Mae Sai is home to the district headquarters of Mae Sai District in the top of Chiang Rai province, Thailand.

Mae Sai may also refer to:
 Mae Sai District, Chiang Rai province, northernmost district of Thailand
 Mae Sai Subdistrict, subdistrict of Mae Sai District
 Mae Sai River
 Mae Sai, Phayao, subdistrict of Mueang Phayao district, Phayao province, Thailand